Kala Chitta Range (in Punjabi and  Kālā Chiṭṭā) is a mountain range in the Attock District of Punjab, Pakistan. Kala- Chitta are Punjabi words meaning Kala the Black and Chitta means white. The range thrusts eastward across the Potohar plateau towards Rawalpindi.

Pakistan's Kuldana Formation is best known for its fossil mammals, including primitive cetaceans such as Pakicetus and their close relatives. Kuldana mammals have been considered in different studies as early Luthecians (early Middle Eocene), late Ypresians (late early Eocene) or, recently, they encompass much of Ypresians up to early Lutheian time (early part of the early Eocene to early Eocene medium).

Kuldana Formation

The Kuldana Formation is located in the Kata Chita hills and is a thin, 20-120 m thick tongue of low-lying continental red beds that lie within a much thicker sequence of foraminifera-rich marine formations. Shallow planktonic and benthic foraminifera limit the age of the Kuldana Formation to the late early or early middle Eocene, and the current interpretation of global sea level stratigraphy favours the latter.

The short duration of the low-water interval when Kuldana mammals have encountered means that differences between samples likely represent differences in local living environments, deposition sites, and sampling, rather than a substantial difference in age.

Kohat formation 

The Kohat formation consists of calcareous shale and light grey limestone. It lies on top of the Kuldana formation and intermingles with the Murree formation of the Rawalpindi group. Formation in the middle Eocene.

Notes

Attock District
Mountain ranges of Khyber Pakhtunkhwa
Mountain ranges of Punjab (Pakistan)